Serob Vardanian (also spelled Serop Vartanian, ; 1864 – 24 November 1899), better known by his noms de guerre Aghbiur Serob and Serob Pasha, was a famed Armenian military commander who organized a guerrilla network that fought against the Ottoman Empire during the latter part of the 19th century.

Life as a revolutionary

Serob was born in 1864 in the village of Sokhord (modern-day Serinbayır, Ahlat) in the district of Ahlat in the Bitlis Vilayet of the Ottoman Empire. Around the age of twenty, he got into a fight with two Turks and ended up killing one of them. The murder forced him to flee to Constantinople. In 1892, he travelled to Romania and opened a coffee shop there, intending to use the shop as a meeting site for young revolutionaries. He eventually joined the Armenian Revolutionary Federation, and returned to Ottoman Armenia, in Bitlis Vilayet, where he took up arms to defend the local Armenian population from Ottoman and Kurdish attackers.

In 1898, in the village of Babshen in Bitlis, a Kurdish expedition was sent by the Ottomans to capture and kill Serop. The Kurds began their offensive at 3:00 a.m., surrounding Serop and his fedayis. The battle continued until sunrise when Serop and his fedayis managed to escape. After the Battle of Babshen, Serop was given the title of "Pasha".

Aghpyur
It is also around this time he gained his pseudonym Aghpur, given to him by the Armenian population because he had the "heart of a lion" and was very courteous. The local Armenian population would often say "Veruh Asdvadz, Vahruh Serop" (literally "God is up there, Serop is down here"), which figuratively means "If God is protecting us from the sky, Serop is protecting us from the ground". As a general, he commanded such famed fedayees as Andranik Ozanian and Kevork Chavoush, among others.

Death
On 1 November 1899, while meeting with several other compatriots, Aghbiur Serob had his pipe poisoned by a fellow Armenian known as "Avé" who had been bribed by Kurdish brigands. The Kurdish brigands, led by Khalil, surrounded the house with hundreds of fighters. A gunfight erupted between the Kurds and the Armenians, the latter having in its ranks twelve of Serob's personal guard, his wife Sose and their son, Hagop. The Kurds managed to defeat the outnumbered Armenians, killing in the process Serob, his son, and twelve of his men including the town priest. Sose was wounded and taken prisoner. Khalil severed Serob's head and placed it on a pike as a warning to all other Armenian freedom fighters.

A mission led by fellow Armenian guerrilla, Zoravar Andranik Ozanian, tracked the Kurds to the home of "Avé", who, along with the Kurds and his own family, was killed.

Legacy
As leader of the Armenian fedayi, Serob made Sasoun almost completely independent. He was described as "one of the most outstanding Armenian revolutionaries" by Leon Trotsky.

See also
Armenian militia
Armenian national movement
List of Armenian national heroes

References

External links 

1864 births
1899 deaths
People from Ahlat
Armenian fedayi
Armenian nationalists
Armenians from the Ottoman Empire
Pashas